Okafor may refer to:

 Alex Okafor (born 1991), American football player
 Amarachi Okafor (born 1977), Nigerian artist
 Bertrand Okafor (born 1990), Nigerian footballer
 Boniface Okafor (born 1966), Nigerian footballer
 Chris Okafor (born 1970), Nigerian minister
 Don Okafor (died 1966), Nigerian army officer
 Emeka Okafor (born 1982), American basketball player
 Fidelis Uzochukwu Okafor (born 1950), vice-chancellor of Anambra State University
 Happiness Okafor, Nigerian professional cyclist
 Jahlil Okafor (born 1995), American basketball player
 Joe Okafor (born 1991), American football nose tackle 
 John Okafor (born 1961), Nigerian actor
 Jon Okafor (born 1989), American soccer player 
 Kelvin Okafor (born 1985), is a British artist of Nigerian descent
 Ngo Okafor (born 1974), actor, boxer and model
 Noah Okafor (born 2000), Swiss footballer 
 Obiora Chinedu Okafor, Canadian lawyer
 Onyekachi Okafor (born 1994), Nigerian footballer 
 Queen Okafor (born 1987), hirsutism sufferer
 Rosemary Okafor (born 1981), Nigerian sprinter
 Sam Okafor (born 1982), Nigerian former footballer
 Simon Akwali Okafor (1934–2014), Roman Catholic bishop
 Uche Okafor (footballer, born 1991), Nigerian footballer
 Uche Okafor (1967–2011), Nigerian footballer
 Ujunwa Okafor (born 1992), Nigerian footballer

See also
 Okafor's Law, 2016 motion picture

Igbo-language surnames